David Berreby is the author of the book Us and Them: The Science of Identity (2008, University of Chicago Press). His work has appeared in The New Yorker, Nature, The New York Times Magazine, Slate, Smithsonian, The Journal of Strategy and Business, The Huffington Post and many other publications.

Biography 
Berreby is an independent science writer and researcher. He was born in France in 1958 to an American mother and Jewish father. His native language is English, although he briefly spoke French. He has spent most of his life in New York City, but attended a "chaotic and untraditional high school run by hippies and idealists" in California. He received his B.A. in English in 1981 from Yale University.

David has worked as an Editor for the City University of New York, Associate Editor for The Sciences at the New York Academy of Sciences, as well as a Freelancer for Discover Magazine. In 1995 David became Science Writing Fellow at the Marine Biological Laboratory in Woods Hole, Massachusetts. His writing has appeared in the New Yorker, the New York Times Magazine, Smithsonian, The New Republic, Slate, Lingua Franca and many other publications.

Awards 
Berreby's book, Us and Them: The Science of Identity (under its previous name Us and Them: Understanding Your Tribal Mind) won the 2006 Erving Goffman Award for Outstanding Scholarship from the Media Ecology Association.

Works by Berreby 
 Us and Them: The Science of Identity (University Of Chicago Press)
 The Things That Divide Us (National Geographic Vol. 233 No. 4)
 The Case for Fitting In
 Bird's Life
 The Punishment Fits the Crime
 Ravens, Robots, and the Nature of Humanness
 Genius in the Making:If a scientific theory about Jews being smart is so politically incorrect, why aren't more people complaining?
 Human Kinds in the Brain: An MRI scan of racial perception
 Can a language be "endangered"?
 Human Kinds in the Making: Race and the Mind
 Dear Colleague...
 Murray Gell-Mann's Quest
 Human Kinds in the Making: The Attention Deficit Tribe
 The Obesity Era

References

External links
 
 http://generalsemantics.org/misc/2008akmlsymposium/2008_program.pdf
 https://www.amazon.com/Us-Them-Identity-David-Berreby/dp/0226044653
 http://www.huffingtonpost.com/david-berreby/#blogger_bio

1958 births
American male writers
City University of New York staff
Living people
Yale College alumni